WVWS is a public radio formatted broadcast radio station licensed to Webster Springs, West Virginia, serving Webster, Braxton, and Upshur counties in West Virginia.  WVWS is owned and operated by West Virginia Educational Broadcasting Authority.

References

External links
West Virginia Public Broadcasting Online

NPR member stations
VWS
Radio stations established in 2012
2012 establishments in West Virginia